PFC Botev Plovdiv (Bulgarian: „Ботев“ Пловдив), commonly referred to as Botev Plovdiv or simply Botev, is a Bulgarian professional association football club based in Plovdiv, Bulgaria, that currently competes in the Bulgarian Parva Liga, the top flight of Bulgarian football. Founded on 11 March 1912, it is the country's oldest active football club.

This is a list of the Botev Plovdiv's achievements in major competitions in Bulgarian and European football. It covers all seasons from 1924 (the beginning of competitive football in Bulgaria), to the most recent completed season.

The club has won 2 Bulgarian Championships, 6 Plovdiv City Championships, 3 Bulgarian Cups, 1 Bulgarian Supercup and 1 Balkans Cup.

Seasons

1924 – 1948 
*In this period, apart from three seasons between 1937 and 1940, there was no national league in Bulgaria. Instead, there was a national knockout competition called the State Football Championship, which determined the champion of Bulgaria. The qualification rules for this championship were constantly changing, with Botev sometimes being able to qualify directly through the Plovdiv City Championship, while at other times having to compete for the Regional Championship against a team from the region. For most of this period, there was also no separate competition for the Bulgarian Cup.

1948 – 1980 
*A national league was established again, this time for good.

1980 – 1990 
*The tournament for the Bulgarian Cup was established. At first, it was a secondary tournament, but from the 1982-83 season, it became the National Cup, with the Cup of the Soviet Army becoming the secondary tournament instead.

1990 – 
*The Cup of the Soviet Army folds after the fall of communism in Bulgaria. In its place the BFU creates the Cup of the BFU, but it also folds after just one season. A few years later, the football authorities again try to establish a secondary cup competition through the creation of the Cup of the PFL (Professional Football League), but it survives just three seasons, as it was not taken seriously by the top clubs in Bulgaria. From the 2003 – 04 season, there is an annual match between the league champion and the Bulgarian Cup holder, which determines the winner of the Bulgarian Supercup.

Key 

 Pos - Position
 Pts - Points
 Pl - Matches Played
 GF - Goals Scored
 GA - Goals Against
 PCC - Plovdiv City Championship
 RG - Regional Championship
 NFD - National Football Division
 SBFD - South Bulgarian Football Division
 QT - Qualification Tournament
 BG Cup - Bulgarian Cup
 SA Cup - Cup of the Soviet Army / Soviet Army Cup
 SC - Supercup
 IC - Intertoto Cup
 CB - Cup of BFU

 CP - Cup of PFL
 ICFC - Inter-Cities Fairs Cup
 BC - Balkans Cup
 EL - Europa League
 UC - UEFA Cup
 CWC - Cup Winners' Cup
 EC - European Cup
 n/a - The competition hasn't been established yet, has ceased to exist or there is no information.
 GP – Group Phase
 W - Winners
 RU - Runners-up
 SF - Semi-finals
 QF - Quarter-finals
 R16/R32/R64 - Round of 16, Round of 32, Round of 64
 R1/R2/R3 - Round 1, Round 2, Round 3
 (I)/(II)/(III) - Shows the level of the league the club plays in after a promotion/relegation or a restructuring of the league system

References 

PFC Botev Plovdiv seasons
Botev Plovdiv